The Malayan horseshoe bat (Rhinolophus malayanus) is a species of bat in the family Rhinolophidae. It is found in Cambodia, Laos, Malaysia, Myanmar, Thailand, and Vietnam.

References

Rhinolophidae
Mammals described in 1903
Taxa named by J. Lewis Bonhote
Taxonomy articles created by Polbot
Bats of Southeast Asia